Iriga station is a railway station located on the South Main Line in Camarines Sur, Philippines. It is still used for the Bicol Express and Bicol Commuter.

Philippine National Railways stations
Railway stations in Camarines Sur
Iriga